Morse High School (Morse or MHS) is a public high school in Bath, Maine, serving the towns of Bath, Phippsburg, Woolwich, and Arrowsic. The student/adult ratio at Morse is 15:1.
The school colors are blue and white. Class elections take place every year. The enrollment is 623 students.

History 
The original school building, a gift to the city from Charles W. Morse, burned down March 24, 1928 and was later rebuilt in 1929. A large addition was made in 1969, and an expanded vocational center was added in 1996.

Montgomery Theater 
Montgomery Theater was a performance hall and the site of several annually performed plays. It was originally built as a part of the 1929 building. The construction of the new school building included and updated Montgomery Theater.

New building project 
There were plans approved by the city council to build a new school at the Wing Farm site on the West Bath/Bath city line. The projected completion date was projected to be December 2020. Students moved into the new building in February 2021. MHS Building Committee consists of 9 members including the Superintendent of the RSU1 school district, Patrick Manuel, several members of the school board, and others from the community as well as people with business experience. The design for the building took in consideration from experts, school staff, and even students to help make decisions on everything from allocated space, to the furniture used.

The new school is able to comfortably accommodate 650 students.  The building closed its doors in 2021, and the new building opened in 2021.

Athletics
Morse students participate in many athletic and social clubs. Championships include six state championships in boys' basketball (1956, '62, '63, '87, '88, and '89), two state championships in baseball (1953 and '88), five state championships in football (1968, '69, '70, '71, and '72), and one state championship in Boys' soccer in 1988.  Morse's boys' swim team won the state championship in the 2005–2006 swim season. The girls' swim team has also enjoyed recent success, winning the 2009–2010 state championship after finishing runners-up or third for several years. Morse is a member of the Kennebec Valley Athletic Conference.

Bath Regional Career and Technical Center
The Bath Regional Career and Technical Center, (Bath Tech), is multi-district vocational program run under principal Julie Kenny. The program provides traditional vocation classes including Automotive Technology, Carpentry, Cosmetology, Criminal Justice, Graphic Design, Culinary Arts, Early Childhood Education, Electricity, Engineering Graphics & Design, Health Science Careers, and Welding.

References

External links

 Morse High School
 Lower Kennebec Region School Unit (RSU 1)

See also 

 RSU 1
 Bath, Maine

Public high schools in Maine
Schools in Sagadahoc County, Maine
Buildings and structures in Bath, Maine